The Heidelberg Mountain Railway is a two-section funicular railway in the city of Heidelberg, Germany. The first section runs from a lower station at Kornmarkt in Heidelberg's Altstadt, via an intermediate station at Heidelberg Castle, to an upper station at Molkenkur. Here passengers may change to the second section, which runs up the Königstuhl, a nearby mountain with good views over the city and the River Neckar.

The upper and lower sections of the funicular have different histories and are sometimes referred to separately by the names Königstuhlbahn and Molkenkurbahn respectively. These two sections present quite different appearances, with the upper section using wooden bodied cars of historic appearance, whilst the lower section uses modern style cars. Similarly the upper stations at Molkenkur and Königstuhl are to the original design, whilst those further down the hill at Kornmarkt and Heidelberg Castle present a more modern image.

The Heidelberger Bergbahn is operated by the Heidelberger Straßen- und Bergbahn AG (HSB), the operator of buses and trams in Heidelberg.  The funicular predominantly serves tourist traffic. The lower section runs every ten minutes throughout the day, whilst the connecting upper section runs every twenty minutes throughout the day. The services start at 9 a.m. and end at times that vary from summer to winter.

Lower section 

The lower section of the funicular (the Molkenkurbahn) opened in 1890, and its original form used the water ballast system of propulsion, similar to that still used by the Nerobergbahn in Wiesbaden. The line was rebuilt to use a conventional electric drive in 1907. Between 1961 and 1962 the section was rebuilt and new cars provided in order to handle the volume of traffic to Heidelberg Castle; at this time new stations were built at Kornmarkt and Heidelberg Castle. The section was closed between October 2003 and March 2005; during the closure period the existing cars were scrapped and replaced by new and larger cars to a modern design, and Kornmarkt and Heidelberg Castle stations were again rebuilt.

The section has the following technical parameters:

Length: 
Height: 
Maximum steepness: 43 %
Configuration: Single track with passing loop
Journey time: 5 minutes
Cars: 2
Capacity: 130 passengers per car
Track gauge: 
Traction: Electricity

Upper section 

The upper section of the funicular (the Königstuhlbahn) opened in 1907, and used a conventional electric drive from the start. It continued to run in its original form until April 2003, when changes to safety regulations forced it to shut down. The section reopened in March 2005; during the closure period the existing cars were rebuilt and provided with new wooden bodies to the original design.

The section has the following technical parameters:

Length: 
Height: 
Maximum steepness: 41 %
Configuration: Single track with passing loop
Journey time: 9 minutes
Cars: 2
Capacity: 50 passengers per car
Track gauge: 
Traction: Electricity

See also 
List of funicular railways

References

Specific

General 

Heidelberger Versorgungs- und Verkehrsbetriebe (Hrsg.), Brigitte Neff: Die Heidelberger Bergbahnen. Stationen der Romantik. Regionalkultur, Ubstadt-Weiher 2006, .

External links 

Official web site of the Bergbahnen (English version) 
Official web site of the Bergbahnen (German version)

Funicular railways in Germany
Former water-powered funicular railways converted to electricity
Heritage railways in Germany
Metre gauge railways in Germany
Mountain railways
Rail transport in Baden-Württemberg
Railway lines opened in 1890
Articles containing video clips
Transport in Heidelberg
Tourist attractions in Heidelberg